Eupithecia minucia is a moth in the  family Geometridae. It is found in Ecuador, Colombia and Bolivia.

References

Moths described in 1899
minucia
Moths of South America